Richard Humphreys may refer to:

Richard Humphreys (philanthropist) (1750–1832), U.S. Quaker philanthropist who funded the establishment of a school for African Americams
Richard Humphreys (judge), Irish judge and former politician
Dick Humphreys (1896–1968), member of Irish Volunteers 
Richard Franklin Humphreys (1911–1968), U.S. scientist
Richard Humphreys (writer) (born 1953), British writer
Ritchie Humphreys (born 1977), British footballer

See also
Richard Humphrey (disambiguation)